Early legislative elections were held in French Polynesia in early 2008. The first round was held on 27 January, with the second round on 10 February. The early elections was the first one to be conducted under a reformed electoral system.

Background

2007 political crisis

In July 2007, Former French Polynesian President Gaston Tong Sang was heavily criticized by Gaston Flosse, former president and the founder of Tong Sang's party, Tahoeraa Huiraatira. Flosse accused Tong Sang of caving in too easily to the demands of some of French Polynesia's minor coalition parties and ignoring the needs of Tahoeraa Huiraatira. Critics of Flosse asserted that the attack was merely a move by Flosse to regain the presidency, an accusation bolstered by revelations that Flosse had "secret talks" with Oscar Temaru, former president and a leading pro-independence politician who has been Flosse's long time political opponent in the past. According to reports, the talks were aimed at ousting Sang from office and setting up a unity platform between Flosse and Temaru's respective political parties.

On 29 August 2007, a no confidence motion was introduced by Temaru's Union for Democracy (UPLD). The UPLD said that the no confidence motion against Tong Sang was based on the fact that he had only small support in the Assembly, thus losing his legitimacy to govern. Tong Sang's own Tahoeraa Huiraatira party asked him to resign ahead of the vote of no confidence against him. Tong Sang refused the calls from his party to step down.

Tong Sang's government fell after the vote of no confidence was passed by French Polynesia's 57 member Assembly on August 31. The motion Sang was passed by a majority 35 members of the Assembly, including some members of the governing Tahoera'a Huiraatira party. Tong Sang tried to save his government by offering Tahoer'a Huiraatira 7 ministerial posts. The deal was refused.

The motion against Tong Sang was the first time that Oscar Temaru's Union for Democracy and Gaston Flosse's Tahoera'a Huiraatira party formed a de facto alliance to oust a sitting French Polynesian government.

Post-crisis
After his ousting from government, Gaston Tong Sang left Tahoera'a Huiraatira and founded a new party, O Porinetia To Tatou Ai'a. The new party, from the onset, had 6 members in the Assembly, all former members of Tahoera'a Huiraatira.

After Tong Sang's ouster, which was the third time a French Polynesian government was ousted from power via motions of no confidence since 2004, calls for electoral reform were heard. This culminated in an electoral reform package that was passed by France in November of the same year.

After elections were announced, President of French Polynesia Oscar Temaru stated that he would prefer to have elections after the French municipal elections in March 2008.

Electoral system
The new system, approved in France on 26 November 2007, was meant to stabilise the chaotic French Polynesian political scene. Under the new system, a two-round election system was promulgated, and candidates from any political party require at least 12.5% of the vote to enter the second round of voting, and a general electoral threshold of 5% was set.

Results

Aftermath
According to reports, the two pro-autonomy/anti-independence factions were likely to agree to form the government for the next five years, but coalition talks broke down on 20 February 2008. The President of the Assembly was decided to be elected on 22 February 2008, with presidential elections in the Assembly to follow on 24 February 2008.

In the election for the President of the Assembly, the incumbent Edouard Fritch was reelected with 36 votes while the pro-independence candidate Antony Géros received 21 votes; one of the 37 pro-autonomy MPs had therefore evidently voted for Géros.

References

External links
Pacific Magazine: Tong Sang Wins First Round Of French Polynesia Voting
BBC News: Colonial ties dominate Polynesia polls

French Polynesia
French Polynesia
Elections in French Polynesia
2008 in French Polynesia
French Polynesia
French Polynesia